Hochwald (Czech Hvozd) is a mountain on the border of Saxony in southeastern Germany and Bohemia in the Czech Republic. Due to the visually appealing views from the mountain, it has earned the nickname Aussichtsturm des Zittauer Gebirges (lit. Lookout Tower of the Zittau Mountains).

Summits

Southern
In 1853, on the Czech side of the mountain, a cottage was built; it burned completely down in 1877. The next year, another was erected in the half-timber style, and a year after that, the  wooden lookout tower, Carola, which would be destroyed in 1891. Because of the numerous visitors, the German side of the mountain saw a restaurant created that still stands today, while the second cottage on the Czech side was demolished in 1951.

Northern
A  stone tower was built due to the initial wooden tower being in a state of disrepair, dedicated on September 14, 1892. A short time later, a ticket sales house was created. It was ultimately turned into a restaurant, in which New Year's Day festivities are held today.

View
From the upper terrace of the mountain, there is an undisturbed field of view east, south, and west. A plethora of other mountains can be seen.

Mountains of Saxony